Buddhism is the second largest religion in the Indian State of Mizoram. It is followed by 8.51 % of its population. There are 93411 Buddhists in Mizoram. Most of the Buddhists in Mizoram are Chakmas  Most of them live in the autonomous region called Chakma Autonomous District Council and follows Theravada branch of Buddhism.

History
The Chakma Buddhists tribe has been in the state for centuries. In 1960s many Chakmas from the Chittagong Hill Tracts of Bangladesh migrated to the Mizoram and other neighbouring Indian states after their lands were submerged by the filling of Kaptai dam. Some also migrated to Mizoram to escape from religious persecution in Bangladesh. 
In 1972, when Mizoram became a State, the Centre government granted the Chakmas tribes autonomy by creating Chakma Autonomous District Council.

Demographics
In 2001 Census, Buddhism constituted 7.93 % of the State's population. It increased slightly to 8.51 % in the 2011 Census. 

About 91.7% or 88,885 Chakmas follows Buddhism.

District wise Buddhist Population

See also
 Christianity in Mizoram

References

Buddhist communities of India
Buddhism in India by state or union territory
Religion in Mizoram